Below are the squads for the 2016 AFF Championship, co-hosted by Myanmar and Philippines, which takes place between 19 November and 17 December 2016.

Each team is allowed to register 22 official players (at least 2 goalkeepers) and one more reserve player.

Group A

Philippines 
Head coach:  Thomas Dooley

Thailand 
Head coach: Kiatisuk Senamuang

Singapore 
Head coach: V. Sundramoorthy

Indonesia 
Head coach:  Alfred Riedl

Group B

Myanmar 
Head coach:  Gerd Zeise

Malaysia 
Head coach: Ong Kim Swee

Vietnam 
Head coach: Nguyễn Hữu Thắng

Cambodia 
Head coach:  Lee Tae-hoon

References

AFF Championship squads
Squads